Jim Weiss (born November 24, 1948, in Highland Park, Illinois) is a children's audio storyteller and author. Weiss released over seventy audio cassettes and CDs since 1989, which are now available for online streaming on audiobook services. Examples of his retellings of stories include various works of Shakespeare, The Three Musketeers, and Sherlock Holmes.  Most of his work is released by Great Hall Productions founded by Weiss and his wife Randy. He is also the narrator for the audio versions of Susan Wise Bauer's popular The Story of the World series. His maxim is Intelligent Entertainment for the Thinking Family.  

Weiss has been recognized by the Film Advisory Board, American Library Association, and Parents Guide to Children Media for his contribution to storytelling and audio entertainment. His works supports the foundations of educators focusing on a classical education, and character building for children. Weiss also has a following in homeschool circles and Christian families. As of 2022 he was producing two recordings a year. The Weiss' have one daughter, and live in Tucson, Arizona.

References

External links
Official website: Great Hall - Storytelling Recordings and Performances by Jim Weiss,
Facebook
Well Trained Mind
Audible
Apple Books
Amazon
YouTube - Great Hall Productions

Audiobook narrators
Living people
1948 births